The 2018 Perth SuperSprint was a motor racing event for the Supercars Championship, held on 4–6 May 2018. The event was held at Barbagallo Raceway near Wanneroo, Western Australia and consisted of two races, 120 and 200 kilometres in length. It was the fifth round of sixteen in the 2018 Supercars Championship and hosted Races 11 and 12 of the season.

Results

Practice

Race 11

Qualifying

Race

 Notes
 – Jamie Whincup received a 5-second Time Penalty for Careless Driving, making contact with Chaz Mostert.
– Anton de Pasquale received a 10-second Time Penalty for a false start.
– Richie Stanaway received a 15-second post-race Time Penalty for Careless Driving, making contact with Lee Holdsworth.

Championship standings after Race 11 

Drivers Championship

Teams Championship

 Note: Only the top five positions are included for both sets of standings.

Race 12

Qualifying

Race

Championship standings after Race 12 

Drivers Championship

Teams Championship

 Note: Only the top five positions are included for both sets of standings.

References 

Perth SuperSprint
Perth SuperSprint